Julian Carr may refer to:
 Julian Carr (industrialist) (1845–1924), North Carolina industrialist, philanthropist, and white supremacist
 Julian Carr (politician) (1824–1886), Member of the Western Australian Legislative Council
 Julian Carr (skier, entrepreneur) (born November 9, 1978), of Salt Lake City, Utah.